Boniface I might refer to:

 Pope Boniface I (d. 422)
 Boniface I, Margrave of Tuscany (d. 823)
 Boniface I, Marquess of Montferrat (d. 1052)